Siroco was one of a dozen s built for the French Navy during the late 1930s under the name Le Corsaire. Although she was still under construction during the Battle of France, the ship sailed to French Algeria to avoid capture by the Germans. She was renamed Siroco in early 1941 while still under construction and was completed later that year and immediately placed in reserve. The destroyer was one of the ships scuttled to prevent their capture in November 1942 when the Germans occupied Vichy France. Captured by the Germans after the Italian armistice in September, the ship was scuttled by the Germans in late 1944 and later scrapped.

Design and description
They were powered by two geared steam turbines, each driving one propeller shaft, using steam provided by four Sural-Penhöet forced-circulation boilers. The crew consisted of 10 officers and 177 enlisted men.

The main armament of the Le Hardi-class ships consisted of six Canon de  Modèle 1932 guns in three twin mounts, one forward and a superfiring pair aft of the superstructure. Their anti-aircraft (AA) armament consisted of one twin mount for Canon de  Modèle 1925 guns on the aft superstructure and two twin Hotchkiss Mitrailleuse de  CA Modèle 1929 AA machine gun mounts on the roof of the shell hoists for the forward 130 mm mount. The ships carried one triple and two twin sets of  torpedo tubes; the aft mount could traverse to both sides, but the forward mounts were positioned one on each broadside. A pair of chutes were built into the stern that housed a dozen  depth charges.

Construction and career
Ordered on 24 May 1937, Le Corsaire was built by Forges et Chantiers de la Méditerranée at their shipyard in La Seyne-sur-Mer. She was laid down on 31 March 1938 and launched on 14 November 1939. The ship was 82% complete and without her guns when the French surrendered on 22 June. Nonetheless, Le Corsaire joined a convoy bound for Oran, French Algeria, that day. After the British attacked French Navy ships in nearby Mers-el-Kébir on 3 July, Le Corsaire joined up with her sister ship  and they reached Toulon on 7 July.

On 1 April 1941, Le Corsaire was renamed Siroco to commemorate the destroyer of that name that was sunk during the Dunkirk evacuation in 1940 and entered service on 1 July, although she was placed in reserve. When the Germans occupied Vichy France on 27 November 1942, Sciroco was scuttled by her crew. The Italians refloated her on 16 April 1943 and redesignated her as FR32. The ship was towed to Genoa, Italy, on 10 June where she was captured by the Germans in September; she was scuttled there on 20 October 1944 as a blockship and later scrapped.

Notes

References

 
 

Le Hardi-class destroyers
Naval ships of France captured by Italy during World War II
1939 ships
World War II warships scuttled at Toulon
Maritime incidents in November 1942